The fan-tailed warbler (Basileuterus lachrymosus) is a New World warbler in the genus Basileuterus that lives along the Pacific slope from northern Mexico to Nicaragua. Vagrant records exist for Arizona, New Mexico and Texas. It is yellow on its throat and underparts with a tawny wash on its chest. The head is gray with a black-framed yellow crown and white around the eyes. The undertail coverlets are white. They are 5.8-6.3 in (14.5–16 cm) long and have pleasant, upslurred song. Fan-tailed warblers live in and at the edge of evergreen and semideciduous forest, especially near ravines. They eat ants, especially army ants, and are seen hopping around on either the forest floor or close to it. They are found alone or in pairs.

Fan-tailed warblers are known to engage in commensal feeding, wherein prey that has been roused or disturbed by the foraging or hunting of another animal is opportunistically captured. They have been observed following and foraging for prey near army ants, other passerines, and nine-banded armadillos.

The fan-tailed warbler is sometimes placed in the monotypic genus Euthlypis due to its unique morphology, but its nest, eggs, voice, and juvenile plumage are consistent with Basileuterus.

References 

  BirdLife International (2007) Species factsheet: Euthlypis lachrymosa. Downloaded from https://web.archive.org/web/20210828092113/https://www.birdlife.org/ on 8/8/2007
Howell, Steven N. G. & Webb, Sophie (1995): A Guide to the Birds of Mexico and Northern Central America. Oxford University Press, Oxford & New York. 
A Guide to the Birds of Panama Second Edition by Ridgely and Gwynne 

fan-tailed warbler
Birds of Central America
Birds of Mexico
Birds of Guatemala
Birds of El Salvador
fan-tailed warbler
fan-tailed warbler